Chondropsidae is a family of sponges belonging to the order Poecilosclerida.

Genera:
 Batzella Topsent, 1893
 Chondropsis Carter, 1886
 Phoriospongia Marshall, 1880
 Psammoclema Marshall, 1880
 Strongylacidon Lendenfeld, 1897

References

Poecilosclerida
Sponge families